Owodunni Teriba (28 February 1938 – 23 April 2020) was a Nigerian scholar, Chief Economist, author and professor who served in various capacities at the Economic Commission for Africa (ECA).

Early life and education 
Teriba was born 28 February 1938 in Ijebu Ode, Ogun State to Kadiri and Ashiata Teriba. He graduated from the University of Ibadan with a B.Sc. (Hons) Economics, and from the University of Manchester, England with an M.A. and a PhD in Economics.

Bibliography 
 Development strategy, investment decision and expenditure patterns of a public development institution; The Western Nigeria Development Corporation, 1949-1962 (1966)
 Nigerian revenue allocation experience 1951-1965: a study in inter-governmental fiscal and financial relations (1967)
 The growth of public expenditure in Western Nigeria (1967)
 Parliamentary control of Western Nigerian public corporations : a critical appraisal (1968)
 The 1967-69 banking amendments in Nigeria : an appraisal of financial adaptation in an underdeveloped war economy (1969)
 The demand for money in Nigeria (1973)
 Illusions and Social Behaviour. Inaugural Lecture delivered at the University of Ibadan on 9 March 1978 (1978)
 The structure of manufacturing industry in Nigeria (1981)
 Certificate economics for West Africa (1985)
 The Challenge of African Economic Recovery and Development (1991)
 A view from the UN commission for Africa (1992)

Death 
Odowunni died at the age of 82 in Chicago, USA. He is survived by his wife  Yetunde Teriba, five children, and grandchildren.

References 

1938 births
2020 deaths
Nigerian economists
University of Ibadan alumni
Alumni of the University of Manchester
Nigerian Christians